The Theodor Pallady Museum is a museum situated in one of the oldest surviving merchant houses in Bucharest, Romania. It includes many works by the well-known Romanian painter Theodor Pallady, as well as a number of European and Oriental furniture pieces. Built in the second half of the 18th century, the house is named after its most illustrious owner, Iacob Melik.

Footnotes

External links

Art museums and galleries in Bucharest